is a Japanese footballer currently playing as a midfielder for Ventforet Kofu.

Career statistics

Club
.

Notes

Honours

Club 
Ventforet Kofu
 Emperor's Cup: 2022

References

External links

1998 births
Living people
People from Fujisawa, Kanagawa
Association football people from Kanagawa Prefecture
Toin University of Yokohama alumni
Japanese footballers
Association football midfielders
J2 League players
Ventforet Kofu players